Virginia's 22nd Senate district is one of 40 districts in the Senate of Virginia. It has been represented by Republican Mark Peake since his victory in a 2017 special election to replace fellow Republican Tom Garrett, who had been elected to Congress.

Geography
District 22 is located in central Virginia, containing a large portion of the City of Lynchburg, part of Louisa County, and all of Amherst, Appomattox, Buckingham, Cumberland, Fluvanna, Goochland, and Prince Edward Counties.

The district overlaps with Virginia's 5th, 6th, and 7th congressional districts, and with the 22nd, 23rd, 24th, 56th, 58th, 59th, 60th, 61st, and 65th districts of the Virginia House of Delegates.

Recent election results

2019

2017 special

2015

2011

Federal and statewide results in District 22

Historical results
All election results below took place prior to 2011 redistricting, and thus were under different district lines. Under the lines drawn in 2011, 22nd district incumbent Ralph K. Smith was redrawn into the 19th district, making the 22nd district an open seat.

2007

2003

1999

1995

District officeholders

References

Virginia Senate districts
Amherst County, Virginia
Appomattox County, Virginia
Buckingham County, Virginia
Cumberland County, Virginia
Fluvanna County, Virginia
Goochland County, Virginia
Louisa County, Virginia
Lynchburg, Virginia